Geoffrey Taylor (born 22 July 1949) is a New Zealand cricketer. He played in seven first-class and two List A matches for Northern Districts from 1973 to 1975.

See also
 List of Northern Districts representative cricketers

References

External links
 

1949 births
Living people
New Zealand cricketers
Northern Districts cricketers
People from Waipawa
Sportspeople from the Hawke's Bay Region